Don Wilson (1930 – 2003) was an English football player and manager, who played in the Football League for Bury.

References

1930 births
2003 deaths
Date of death missing
Place of death missing
Association football fullbacks
English footballers
Bury F.C. players
Mossley A.F.C. players
English Football League players
English football managers
Mossley A.F.C. managers
Stalybridge Celtic F.C. managers
Radcliffe F.C. managers